Hans Joachim Rolfes was a German
World War I flying ace credited with 17 confirmed and two unconfirmed aerial victories. He scored his first confirmed victory while with Royal Bavarian Jagdstaffel 32, on 6 July 1917. His second and subsequent victories were while leading Royal Prussian Jagdstaffel 45 during the first nine months of 1918. On 29 September 1918, he was additionally given command of a four squadron wing. Rolfes died in an aviation accident on 12 August 1935.

Biography

Early life and cavalry service

On 18 April 1894, Hans Joachim Rolfes was born in Port Elizabeth, South Africa. His father was the German Consul there. Rolfes began his education in local schools before being sent to London to study.

In 1912, he went home to Germany to enlist in the 14th Dragoon Regiment. He was still with them when they moved to the front as the First World War began. On 24 December 1914, he was commissioned as a Leutnant. Serving as such, he was badly wounded on 31 August 1915.

Aviation career

As he recovered, he requested transfer to aviation duty. After pilot training with Fliegerersatz-Abteilung 2 (Replacement Detachment 2), he was posted to Kagohl 2 (Tactical Bomber Wing 2) on 5 October 1915. As Kagohl 2 was composed of several different squadrons based separately, Rolfes flew on both the Eastern and Western Fronts. At some point, he transferred to Kampfstaffel 11 (Tactical Bomber Squadron 11); there he claimed an unconfirmed victory over a French Voisin. On 20 February 1917, he was transferred to a fighter squadron, Jagdstaffel 32. He scored his first accredited aerial victory while flying with them, shooting down a Farman over Moronvillers, France on 6 July 1917.

On 17 December 1917, he was appointed to form a new fighter squadron, Jagdstaffel 45. He began scoring victories with them on 20 January 1918, running off a string of 16 more confirmed victories and an unconfirmed one. In July 1918 or early August, he was re-equipped with a Fokker D.VII. On 29 September 1918, he shot down his 17th and last confirmed victim. That was also the day the German High Command decided to combine his squadron with Jagdstaffeln 9, 21, and 66 to form Jagdgruppe Ost. Rolfes was given command of the Jagdgruppe in addition to commanding his own squadron. By war's end, he had been awarded the House Order of Hohenzollern, as well as both classes of the Iron Cross.

List of victories

Confirmed victories listed in date order. Unconfirmed claims are marked 'u/c'.
Doubled lines in table indicate change of assignment.

Postwar

Hans Joachim Rolfes died in an aviation accident at Johannisthal Air Field, just outside Berlin, on 12 August 1935.

Sources of information

References

 Above the Lines: The Aces and Fighter Units of the German Air Service, Naval Air Service and Flanders Marine Corps, 1914–1918. Norman Franks, Frank W. Bailey, Russell Guest. Grub Street, 1993. .
Fokker D VII Aces of World War 1, Part 2 Norman Franks, Greg VanWyngarden. Osprey Publishing, 2004. 

1894 births
1935 deaths
People from Port Elizabeth